The Utah Democratic Party is the affiliate of the Democratic Party in the U.S. state of Utah. Its platform focuses on economic security, equal opportunity, the common good, and American leadership. The party also describes itself as a big tent party.

History
The Democratic Party originated around 1884 in Utah. In 1896, more than 80 percent of the state vote went toward William Jennings Bryan, a Democrat, and the state elected several Democrats to state and local offices. The Democratic legislature elected Joseph L. Rawlins to serve as a U.S. Senator and William H. King to the House.

Reed Smoot had a political alliance with the Mormons and Gentiles that helped the Republican Party to gain power. The Democrats did not have as much power after 1900. Although, in 1924, Democratic legislator George Dern beat the incumbent Republican Governor Charles Mabey winning on the slogan, "We Want a Dern Good Governor and We Don't Mean Mabey".

In the 1930s, the Democrats had more success. President Franklin D. Roosevelt selected Governor Dern as the Secretary of War. Elbert D. Thomas beat incumbent Reed Smoot in the Senate and served until 1950. Herbert B. Maw was elected to the state senate in 1928. He then became the President of the Utah Senate. They passed bills dealing with unemployment assistance and they created an open primary law.

Maw was elected governor in 1940 and was reelected in 1944, but lost in 1948. In the same year, Reva Beck Bosone was elected to the House of Representatives as a Democrat. She was the first woman from Utah to be elected to Congress.

In 1958, Frank E. "Ted" Moss was elected to the U.S. Senate and remained there until the 1970s. Cal Rampton, a moderate Democrat, was elected governor in 1964.

The Democratic Party weakened in the 1970s and 1980s after split opinions over the Equal Rights Amendment. They became stronger in the 1990s; Wayne Owens was reelected in the 2nd District and Bill Orton was elected to Congress from the 3rd District. It still remains a clear minority in state politics.

Beverly White, the longest serving woman in the Utah State Legislature, was a member of the Democratic Party.

State party organization

Party executive officers

State-party caucuses
The Utah Democratic Party recognizes 15 statewide caucuses. Each caucus promotes issues related to its mission:
 African American Caucus
 Disability Caucus
 Education Caucus
 Environmental Caucus
 Healthcare Caucus
 Hispanic Caucus
 Labor Caucus
 LDS Caucus
 Pacific Islander Caucus
 Progressive Caucus
 Rural Caucus
 Utah Stonewall Democrats
 Utah Public Employees Caucus
 Women's Caucus
 Young Democrats of Utah

Election results

Presidential

Gubernatorial

County party organization
Each of Utah's 29 Counties has a party organization, which operates within that county and sends state delegates to the Utah Democratic Party's state convention each year. County delegates are selected at caucus meetings held on the third Tuesday of March in election years (even numbered years) and serve two year terms. In April, county delegates selected at the March caucus meetings gather at their respective county conventions to select state delegates and nominate county candidates or state legislative candidates where the legislative district is entirely within their county.

The Utah Democratic Party's state convention is typically held within the first two weeks of May following these county conventions in election years, but may be held later in odd numbered years. At state conventions state delegates vote to determine the party's nominees in federal races or in state races where the district crosses county lines in what is referred to as a "nominating convention." A candidate must receive at least 60% of the vote at the nominating convention to become the party's nominee. If a candidate falls short of this goal the nominee is determined through a primary. In Utah, Democratic primaries are open to all registered voters, but a registered voter may only participate in one party's primary. The Republican primary is closed to all but registered Republicans (Unaffiliated registered voters may change their affiliation on election day to vote in a Republican primary.)

In odd numbered years county and state delegates gather at county organizing conventions and the state organizing convention respectively to determine their county and state party leadership. Positions up for election at these conventions are party chair, vice chair, secretary and treasurer. Together these offices make up the executive officers of the respective county parties and the Utah Democratic Party. A simple majority is sufficient to elect someone to each of these positions, though it may take up to two ballots in order to receive a majority of the delegates' votes. All county party chairs and vice chairs are automatically assigned to the Utah Democratic Party's central committee. Counties may have additional representatives in this body depending upon population.

Current elected officials

Members of Congress
U.S. Senate
None
Both of Utah's senate seats have been held by Republicans since 1977. Frank Moss was the last Democrat to represent Utah in the United States Senate.

U.S. House of Representatives

 None

All of Utah's congressional districts have been held by Republicans since 2021. Ben McAdams was the last democrat to represent Utah in the United States House of Representatives.

Statewide offices
None

State Legislature
Senate Minority Leader: Karen Mayne
Senate Minority Whip: Luz Escamilla
Assistant Minority Leader: Jani Iwamoto
House Minority Leader: Brian King
House Minority Whip: Carol Spackman Moss
Assistant Minority Whip: Angela Romero

Notable members

Governors

Simon Bamberger
George Henry Dern
Henry Hooper Blood
Herbert Brown Maw
Calvin Lewellyn Rampton
Scott Milne Matheson

Senators

Joseph L. Rawlins
William H. King
Elbert D. Thomas
Orrice Abram Murdock Jr.
Frank E. Moss

Representatives

William H. King
Brigham Henry Roberts
Milton H. Welling
James Henry Mays
Abe Murdock
J. W. Robinson
Walter K. Granger
Reva Beck Bosone
M. Blaine Peterson
David S. King
K. Gunn McKay
Wayne Owens
Allan Turner Howe
Karen Shepherd
William Orton
Jim Matheson
Ben McAdams

See also
Democratic Party
Utah Republican Party
Utah Libertarian Party

References

External links
 Utah Democratic Party
 

 
Democratic Party
Democratic Party (United States) by state